Döblitz is a village and a former municipality in the Saalekreis district, Saxony-Anhalt, Germany. Since 1 January 2011, it has been part of the town of Wettin-Löbejün.
 
Its historical and cultural society Förderverein Kultur und Geschichte Döblitz e.V. volunteers in preserving an old Romanesque church to maintain the cultural heritage and to offer cultural events to the community and to the region throughout the year.

Geography 
Döblitz is located in the nature reserve "Unteres Saaltal" in the north-west of Halle (Saale).

History

History 
The village of Döblitz was first mentioned in 1286 in a deed of gift, in which it is called Dobelicz. Founded on the banks of the river Saale, it used to be a fishing village. Like many other settlements to the east of the Saale, Döblitz is of Slavic origin.

Coat of arms 
The coat of arms was approved by the Regierungspräsidium Halle on 4 May 1999. It shows a red sailing boat with a blue pennant. The vessel is sailing on blue water with two silver waves. The background of the coat of arms is also silver.

Sights

Culture

Literature 
 Siegmar von Schultze-Galléra: Wanderungen durch den Saalkreis (Band 2), Halle 1914

External links 
 Website of the Förderverein Kultur und Geschichte Döblitz e.V. 

Former municipalities in Saxony-Anhalt
Wettin-Löbejün